María Elena Torres Baltazar (born 23 October 1961) is a Mexican politician affiliated with the Party of the Democratic Revolution. As of 2014 she served as Deputy of the LX Legislature of the Mexican Congress representing the Federal District.

References

1961 births
Living people
Politicians from Mexico City
Women members of the Chamber of Deputies (Mexico)
Party of the Democratic Revolution politicians
21st-century Mexican politicians
21st-century Mexican women politicians
Deputies of the LX Legislature of Mexico
Members of the Chamber of Deputies (Mexico) for Mexico City